Jordan Brady (born June 21, 1983) is an American former professional basketball player and former head coach with the Wisconsin Herd of the NBA G League creating a 33-67 record and having a 0.330 with them in his 2-year career with them. last he is one of the assistant coaches with the Windy City Bulls of the NBA G League.

He played college basketball at Dawson Community College, Salt Lake Community College and Utah Valley.

He played internationally for Basket Racing Club Luxembourg.  He played in the NBA D-League for the Utah Flash in 2009. In 2011, he played for the Los Angeles D-Fenders and the Idaho Stampede.

References

1983 births
Living people
American expatriate basketball people in Luxembourg
American men's basketball coaches
American men's basketball players
Bakersfield Jam coaches
Basketball coaches from Utah
Basketball players from Utah
Idaho Stampede coaches
Idaho Stampede players
ASEAN Basketball League coaches
Eastern Sports Club basketball coaches
Iowa Energy coaches
Junior college men's basketball players in the United States
Los Angeles D-Fenders coaches
People from Vernal, Utah
Salt Lake Bruins men's basketball players
Salt Lake City Stars coaches
Utah Flash players
Utah Valley Wolverines men's basketball players
Wisconsin Herd coaches
Forwards (basketball)
Dawson Bucs men's basketball players
Windy City Bulls coaches